The Bagdi or Wagdi are a people of India who are one of the Bhil tribes. They historically spoke the Wagdi language. However today the largest number of Bagdi speak Hindi with others speaking such languages as Malvi and Marwari.

See also
 Bagdi Raja

References

Scheduled Tribes of India
Social groups of Madhya Pradesh
Social groups of Rajasthan